The Beheading of Saint John the Baptist is a 15th-century tempera painting by Giovanni di Paolo. It depicts the beheading of John the Baptist.

References

Paintings depicting John the Baptist
Paintings in the collection of the Art Institute of Chicago